Probability and Mathematical Statistics is a peer-reviewed scientific journal covering mathematical  aspects of the probability theory. It was founded in 1980 as the initiative of the Wrocław probability community led by Kazimierz Urbanik and Czesław Ryll-Nardzewski, and statistics community represented by Witold Klonecki. They served as editors of the journal during the first twenty-five years of its existence, with Kazimierz Urbanik shouldering the role of the editor-in-chief. Beginning with 2007, Probability and Mathematical Statistics became an affiliated journal of the Institute of Mathematical Statistics. PMS (ISSN 0208-4147) is indexed by Scopus, MathSciNet, Index Copernicus and Journal Citation Reports (IF=0.617). PMS is an open-access journal.

External links 

 BazTech
 SCIMAGO

Abstracting and indexing
The journal is abstracted and indexed in 
 JCR
MathSciNet
Zentralblatt MATH
 SCOPUS

References 

Mathematics journals
Publications established in 1980
English-language journals
Biannual journals

See also
List of mathematical physics journals
List of probability journals
List of statistics journals